Taboo is a stage musical with a book by Mark Davies Markham (extensively rewritten for the Broadway production by Charles Busch), lyrics by Boy George, and music by George, John Themis, Richie Stevens and Kevan Frost.

Set in an abandoned London warehouse, the partly imagined story of a group of club 'names' set in the location of what was the city's most fashionable nightclub, the now-legendary Taboo (1985–87) of the title, which was the creation of Leigh Bowery. Boy George is featured as one of the club's regulars, but in reality, George rarely attended. The show also focuses on George's life prior to and after achieving fame.

Productions
The show premiered in London's West End at the newly opened Venue Theatre on January 29, 2002, produced by Adam Kenwright, written by Boy George & Mark Davies Markham with a cast that included Luke Evans, Euan Morton, Matt Lucas and was directed by Christopher Renshaw with choreography by Les Child and costume design by Mike Nicholls. Comedian/talk-show host Rosie O'Donnell was so enamoured with it that she decided to finance a Broadway production. After 16 previews, it opened on November 13, 2003, at the Plymouth Theatre. Hampered by mostly scathing reviews, the production closed after 100 performances. The cast, directed by Christopher Renshaw, included Boy George (credited under his real name, George O'Dowd), Euan Morton, Liz McCartney, Raúl Esparza, Sarah Uriarte Berry, Jeffrey Carlson, and Cary Shields. O'Donnell reportedly lost her entire $10 million investment in the project. O'Donnell said in a 2007 interview about Leigh Bowery that she will take Taboo back to Broadway in the future.

Plot

Although predominantly taking place some years after it concluded, the show is based partly on the New Romantic scene of the late 1970s and early 1980s. At its core is the life and career of colourful pop star Boy George (who rose to global prominence in the early 1980s with his band Culture Club) and his contemporaries, including performance artist and club promoter Leigh Bowery, pop singer Marilyn, Blitz nightclub host Steve Strange (later of the electro-pop group Visage), and Philip Sallon, punk groupie and Mud Club promoter. Although George was intimate with the central figures, artistic license around relationships and time frames was taken for continuity; for example, Bowery never attended the Blitz nightclub, as he was living in Australia at the time.

2002 West End production

Act 1

The show begins with Philip Sallon introducing us to all the New Romantics in London's Soho district ("Ode To Attention Seekers").

Next we enter the James family home where Billy lives with his mom, Josie, and dad, Derek  who is unemployed thanks to the Thatcher era. Billy's dad starts ranting about Billy being a waste of space and starts to mock him because he wants to be a photographer. Billy finally snaps and decides it's time to leave home and move to London and discover himself. He packs his bag and says goodbye to his long suffering mom and leaves ("Safe In the City").

Billy is in London. Whilst walking around the streets, he runs into a cross-dressing drug dealer named Petal, but Phillip drags Billy away from him. Philip tells Billy he knows of a place where he can stay, a squat with a few other people living there. ("Gimme A Freak")

On arriving at the squat Billy is met by the fiery Kim, a punk looking girl who wants to be a fashion designer. She says he can't live there as it's full, but George, her roommate, decides Billy can stay with them. George is wearing heavy makeup and what can only be described as a white toga; Billy is fascinated by him. George explains to Billy that his father is a builder so he was never happy with how George turned out, but his mother is a different story. Billy goes to the kitchen with Kim whilst George reflects on his mother's unconditional love towards him ("Stranger In This World"). When Billy reenters the room George kisses Billy taking him by surprise and Billy runs off.

At the local night club we meet Steve Strange who is acting as bouncer. Kim, Billy, Philip, and George arrive at the club for a big night out. Billy is fascinated by the club's patrons and begins to take pictures of everyone. Steve Strange premieres his new hit record ("Fade To Grey"), but the rest of the revelers are sick of hearing the song so they pull the plug halfway through his performance. Petal turns up dealing drugs but the bouncer kicks him out after a disturbance. The audience is then introduced to another popular face on the New Romantic scene, Marilyn, a man who dresses like Marilyn Monroe ("Genocide Peroxide"). We then meet Jane who works for the magazine ID, she asks George for a quote about the New Romantic scene and he gives one.

During the night we go into the men's bathroom at the club to find Leigh Bowery, an outrageous fashion designer and performance artist who traveled from his home land, Australia, to be a part of the New Romantic scene. He explains to the audience that he can't get enough of boys with pretty faces. Billy enters the bathroom and is amazed by Leigh's outlandish look ("I'll Have You All"). Leigh is instantly attracted to the good looking photographer and gives him his number. ("I'll Have You - Reprise")

Time has swiftly moved on and Kim and Billy are closer than ever. Billy is taking pictures of Kim modeling her latest creations. The two are falling for each other ("Love Is a Question Mark"). Just when they are about to take their actions further, George comes home and makes a scene by flirting with Billy and insisting he should be with him. George and Kim start to argue with each other. Billy is sick of it and runs off.

Out on the street late at night, cross-dressing drug dealer Petal is selling drugs ("Shelter"). Billy walks the streets after running out on Kim and George bumps into Petal. He expresses his disgust at Petal's dealing and almost winds up getting attacked by Petal but luckily Billy manages to get away.

Billy's mom is on the phone with Kim and the two talk about their love for Billy. Josie just wants to know that her son is ok. Kim reassures her that he's fine. On her own Kim starts to question whether Billy will still like her even if she removes all her makeup and opens up to him, a prospect terrifying to her ("Pretty Lies").

When Billy sees Kim without the make up he is shocked out how beautiful she looks. Kim apologizes for her and George arguing and explains it's just how they are and that they love each really. Kim explains to Billy that she is a virgin, and before you know it the two are in the bedroom and couldn't be happier. ("Love Is A Question Mark - Reprise")

George, annoyed that Billy wants to be with Kim instead of him, joins Marilyn and heads down to Selfridges, a department store, to do some shopping. George tells Marilyn that he's met a drummer who wants him to sing in his band, Marilyn is excited for him, if not a little jealous. After a quick run in with the sales girl who is disgusted at the appearance of both men the two discuss their fantasies of being famous ("Guttersnipe").

Josie is at home missing Billy and wondering where her life went so wrong, she doesn't love her abusive husband anymore, the only night out she gets is down the local pub, and her life is just going in no direction ("Talk Amongst Yourselves"). Josie then calls Billy, but he's out and Phillip answers the phone instead. He invites Josie down to London to come and see Billy at Philips club and Josie wholeheartedly decides to go and visit her son.

Its time for George to record his demo with his new group Culture Club and the session goes well, apart from the producer stopping one song after realizing that George was singing about another man. ("The Eyes of Medusa") So he records a different song to keep the producer happy ("Do You Really Want To Hurt Me"). Culture Club start to rise to fame and their single hits number 1. Billy sees George at the club and tries to talk to him but after George felt Billy picked Kim over him George isn't so forthcoming. Eventually George lets Billy take his picture and Billy flirts outrageously, but it appears he is just using George.

George runs into Jane who used to work for ID magazine now works for the Sun, Jane never used to give him any attention in ID magazine but now he's a star she's begging him for an interview. Jane storms out and as she does Billy bumps into her and tells her he's got some pictures of George and asks if the paper would buy them. Jane isn't interested but, she hands Billy her card if he ever has any juicy stories about George and leaves.

Billy tries to talk to George again and asks if he could put a word in for him at his record company to be a photographer. George annoyed that Billy has barely asked him how he is, leaves annoyed. Billy not knowing what to do calls Leigh Bowery who told him to call if he was ever at a loose end. Leigh tells him to come round and that he will make Billy's dreams a reality. Leigh is entering his latest creation in to a talent contest called the Miss Mud Day Queen Ball and wants Billy to model for him. Leigh tells Billy that he can get him in front of the camera instead of behind it, he just has to do everything Leigh tells him to. ("Guttersnipe - Reprise")

When Billy gets to Leigh's house, Leigh and his slaves begin to give Billy a makeover to turn him in to a star of the New Romantic scene ("Touched By The Hand Of Cool"). Leigh tells Billy he will make him the talk of the town and proceeds to call everyone telling them that Billy is now one of his models and will be in the show. Rumors also start to fly that Billy is sleeping with Leigh, which get back to Kim leaving her heartbroken ("Church Of The Poisoned Mind").

It's the day of the Miss Mud Day Queen Ball and Leigh's collection wins the contest, modeling it is Billy now nicknamed Spartacus. Leigh also announces he is opening a club called Taboo. In walks Kim and Billy's mother, shocked at what they see and Leigh makes Kim believe that the two have been sleeping with each other. Kim is outraged and his mother is disappointed in him and the two leave Billy alone ("Stranger In This World Reprise").

Act 2

Taboo is now open and everyone who is anyone is there ("Everything Taboo"). Kim and Josie, who has decided to leave Billy's dad and stay with Kim in London, go to the club to see what all the fuss is about. Whilst at the club Josie and Kim decide to team up and create a fashion line of their own and rent a flat from Philip who is with them. Billy is now hanging out with Boy George and Kim sees them together and presumes that they are sleeping together. Billy tries to apologise to Kim about the Leigh Bowery incident but Kim doesn't want to hear it, she claims that he is just using people who can help his career. Billy tells Leigh he doesn't want to work as his model anymore as he's unhappy and wants Kim back and Leigh calls him ungrateful. Josie tells Billy she is ashamed of him and annoyed at what he's done to Kim.

George now deeply affected by fame has begun to take drugs specifically with Petal and Marilyn at the club. George gives Billy drugs and Billy asks George if he can work at Virgin Records and be the official Boy George photographer. George agrees and tells Billy to go to Virgin and tell them that he's working for George now and Billy is thrilled.

Josie and Kim are at home and their business is starting to take off. Josie is like a new woman full of ambition, shes found a true friend in Kim and in Philip. Then there's a knock at the door and it's Josie's husband, Derek. He wants her to come home but Josie stands up to him. He takes an instant dislike to Philip and Kim and verbally abuses them causing Josie to kick him out. Josie is shocked she has just stood up to him after all these years ("Independent Woman").

Back in George's Apartment he and Marilyn are having a drug binge and George's habit has gotten completely out of control. Billy enters annoyed at George after going to Virgin Records expecting a job but realizing George had not set it up. He tells George enough is enough and that he's killing himself with the drugs ("I See Through You"). Billy storms out with Marilyn leaving George alone.

Walking home from the shop Philip sees Josie's husband at the bus stop. Philip tells Derek that Josie did the right thing ending it with him. Derek beats Philip up in the street and spits on him, leaving Philip bruised and bloodied ("Petrified").

Leigh's live-in helper, Sue, opens a giant curtain to reveal that Leigh has installed himself behind a sheet of glass as a work of art at an art gallery. He explains to the audience that he is art (Ich Bin Kunst). After his performance art Sue tells Leigh that he needs to go to the hospital for a check up, but Leigh won't go, he's obviously scared about his HIV positive status. ("Ich Bin Kunst - Reprise")

Billy has been away to New York to photograph Marilyn's first concert to launch his debut single. When he arrives in London he goes to see his Mom, Kim, and Philip. Kim still refuses to talk to Billy. Billy tells her that he can't stop thinking of her and apologizes for sleeping with George. Kim starts to come around but unfortunately her efforts are wasted as George turns up at the house and has a go at Billy for leaving him and going to New York with Marilyn. George collapses in a heap on the floor. Josie and Kim are shocked at Billy for knowing that George was abusing drugs and not trying to help him.

Billy meets up with Jane and gives her pictures of George using drugs and the full story about his addiction. He takes no money, he does it thinking that it will push George to get help. The story breaks and the media is outrage at George. ("Do You Reallly Want To Hurt Me - Reprise")

George is arrested for possession of drugs and the seriousness of his addiction hits him. George, Steve Strange, Marilyn and Billy all ponder how they have his rock bottom. George reflects how quick his life is falling apart, Marilyn thinks about his failed career, Steve realizes he's a has been, and Billy is riddled with guilt over what he has done to George ("Out Of Fashion").

At the hospital Leigh lays dying of AIDS, his trusted friend Sue is the only with him when he dies ("Il Adore").

Back on the street of London, Petal is still dealing drugs. Annoyed Billy tries to stop him selling to a young boy and ends up in fight with Petal. The dealer pulls a knife on Billy but just in the nick of time George turns up to rescue him. The two talk about everything what has happened and the mistakes they have made. Billy apologizes for informing the media about Georges addiction, but George tells him that Billy revealing the story saved his life ("Pie In The Sky").

Billy tells George how he's going to India to take some time to study with the Hare Krishners and that George should join with him if he'd like. So George, Billy, Philip, Kim, and Josie all go travel to India. After a few weeks the group decides to go home after finding the answers they were looking for, but Billy decides he's going to stay for a while and take some time to think ("Bow Down Mister").

And the entire company, sing ("Karma Chameleon as they leave the stage.

Characters, Original London production and UK tour
 Billy – the protagonist, Billy is an aspiring photographer. Frustrated with suburban life in Bromley, he runs to London ('Safe in the city') to make his fortune. There he meets Philip Sallon, who introduces him to Kim and George. He soon falls in love with Kim, and attaches himself to George's rising star. Not based on any one real life person. Played by Luke Evans in the original London production.
 Kim – an aspiring punk fashion designer and George's squat-mate. Kim is fiery but insecure, rarely emerging from behind her makeup. She ran away from home at 15, and her mother was too drunk to come looking for her. Not based on any one real life person.  Played by Dianne Pilkington in the Original London Cast
 George – Artist, poet, singer/songwriter George O'Dowd is shown before and during his initial success, as a supporting role. He takes an immediate shine to Billy. Thrives on attention and shocking others, never appears dressed conventionally. Originally played by Euan Morton, of whom Boy George said was 'more Boy George than I am'.
 Leigh Bowery – flamboyant Australian designer and performance artist. He delights in antagonising Kim, and is constantly surrounded by a gaggle of admirers/slaves. Absorbs Billy into his flock.  Played by Matt Lucas in the London production and Boy George himself on Broadway productions.
 Philip Sallon – the second person Billy meets in London, who takes him to Kim and George's squat. Opens the show. Character based on a real person. He was played by Paul Baker.
 Josie James – Billy's mother, who later becomes Kim's best friend and business partner. Not based on any one real life person. Supposedly a part written specially for the performer Lyn Paul to play.
 Marilyn – another of the Blitz Kids, Marilyn is first George's rival, then best friend.
 Janey – a reporter for the Sun newspaper, who has a connection to George.
 Steve Strange – doorman at the 'Blitz' club, and singer with the group Visage who achieved success with 'Fade to Grey'. Good-natured rival of George.
 Derek – Billy's father. Violent, drunk and homophobic, he beats up Philip for verbally teasing him. Not based on any one real life person.
 Petal – scary cross-dressing drug pusher. Not a convincing woman, just a violent man in a miniskirt. In previews Petal killed Billy near the end of the show. Based on a very real person.
 Big Sue – Leigh's main assistant and confidante. Character based on Sue Tilley.
 Gary/Guru Dazzle – the bouncer at the 'Blitz' club, who becomes a Krishna devotee.

Songs

Original London Production & UK tour

 Act I
 "Ode To Attention Seekers" – Philip Sallon and Freaks
 "Safe In The City" – Billy
 "Freak" – Philip Sallon and Freaks
 "Stranger In This World" – Boy George and Josie
 “Fade to Grey” - Steve Strange and Princess Julta
 "Genocide Peroxide" – Marilyn and Ensemble
 "I'll Have You All" – Leigh Bowery and Billy
 “I’ll Have You All” (Reprise) - Leigh Bowery and Phillip Sallon
 "Love Is A Question Mark" – Billy and Kim
 "Shelter" – Petal and Tarts
 "Pretty Lies" – Kim
 "Love Is A Question Mark" (Reprise) - Phillp
 "Guttersnipe" – George and Marilyn
 "Talk Amongst Yourselves" – Josie
 "The Eyes of Medusa" / Do You Really Want To Hurt Me" – Boy George
 "Guttersnipe" (Reprise) - Billy
 "Touched By The Hand Of Cool" – Leigh Bowery, Billy and Slaves
 “Church of the Poison Mind” - Kay Cole and Ensemble
 "Stranger In This World" (Reprise) – Billy, Marilyn, Petal, Steve Strange, Big Sue and Ensemble

 Act II
 "Everything Taboo" – Leigh Bowery and Full Company
 "Independent Woman" - Josie, Kim and Phillip Sallon
 "I See Through You" - Billy
 "Petrified" – Philip Sallon
 "Ich Bin Kunst" – Leigh Bowery
 "Ich Bin Kunst" (Reprise) - Leigh Bowery
 “Do You Really Want To Hurt Me (Reprise) - Ensemble
 "Out Of Fashion" – Steve Strange, Billy, Boy George and Marilyn
 "Il Adore" – Big Sue
 "Pie in the Sky" – Boy George and Billy 
 Bow Down Mister" – Full Company

Encore:
 "Karma Chameleon" – Ensemble

2012 London Revival

 "Ode To Attention Seekers" – Philip and Freaks
 "Safe In The City" – Billy
 "Stranger In This World" – George and Josie
 "Dress To Kill" - Freaks
 "Fade To Grey" – Steve Strange and Princess Julia
 "Genocide Peroxide" – Marilyn
 "I'll Have You All" – Leigh
 "Love Is A Question Mark" – Billy and Kim
 "Shelter" – Petal and Tarts
 "Pretty Lies" – Kim and George
 "Guttersnipe" – Marilyn, George and Company
 "Talk Amongst Yourselves" – Josie
 "The Eyes Of Medusa / Do You Really Want To Hurt Me" – George
 "Touched By The Hands Of Cool" – Leigh, Sue and Slaves
 "Talk Amongst Yourselves" (Reprise) – Derek
 "Stranger In This World" (Reprise) – Billy, Marilyn, Steve, George, Leigh and Philip

 Act II
 "Everything Taboo" – Leigh and Company
 "No Need To Work So Hard" – Philip, Kim and Josie
 "I See Through You" – Billy
 "Petrified" – Philip
 "Ich Bin Kunst" – Leigh and Sue
 "No Need To Work So Hard / Stranger In This World (Reprise)" – Josie, Kim and Billy
 "Il Adore" – Big Sue
 "Out Of Fashion" – Steve, George, Marilyn and Billy
 "Pie In The Sky" – George, Kim and Billy
 "Come On In From the Outside" – Company

Encore:
 "Karma Chameleon" – Company

Broadway production

 Act I
 "Freak" / "Ode to Attention Seekers" – Philip Sallon and Ensemble
 "Stranger in This World" – George, Big Sue, Philip Sallon and Ensemble
 "Safe in the City" – Nicola and Ensemble
 "Dress to Kill" – Ensemble
 "Genocide Peroxide" – Marilyn and Ensemble
 "I'll Have You All" – Leigh Bowery and Men
 "Sexual Confusion" – Big Sue, Philip Sallon, George and Marcus
 "Pretty Lies" – George
 "Guttersnipe" – George, Marilyn and Ensemble
 "Love is a Question Mark" – Marcus, George, Leigh Bowery and Nicola
 "Do You Really Want to Hurt Me?" – George and Ensemble
 "Church of the Poison Mind" / "Karma Chameleon" – George and Ensemble

 Act II
 "Everything Taboo" – Leigh Bowery and Ensemble
 "Talk Amongst Yourselves" – Big Sue
 "The Fame Game" – George and Ensemble
 "I See Through You" – Marcus
 "Ich Bin Kunst" – Leigh Bowery
 "Petrified" – Philip Sallon
 "Out of Fashion" – George, Marilyn, Philip Sallon, Marcus and Leigh Bowery
 "Il Adore" – Nicola and Ensemble
 "Come On in From the Outside" – Company

Awards and nominations

Original London production

Original Broadway production

2012 London revival

Cast recordings 
Two cast albums have been released: the original West End cast in 2002, and the original Broadway cast in 2004.

References

External links
 
 2012 Revival Official Site
 Official Site
 Review by Lyn Gardner, The Guardian, May 23, 2002.
 Raul Esparza - Downstage Center interview at American Theatre Wing.org, April 2005
 2016 City Center interview with Andy Mientus about Taboo

2002 musicals
Broadway musicals
West End musicals
Drag (clothing)-related musicals
British musicals
Musicals set in London